This is a list of electoral divisions and wards in the ceremonial county of Worcestershire in the West Midlands. All changes since the re-organisation of local government following the passing of the Local Government Act 1972 are shown. The number of councillors elected for each electoral division or ward is shown in brackets.

County council

Worcestershire
Electoral Divisions from 1 April 1998 (first election 1 May 1997) to 5 May 2005:

Electoral Divisions from 5 May 2005 to present:

District councils

Bromsgrove
Wards from 1 April 1974 (first election 7 June 1973) to 3 May 1979:

Wards from 3 May 1979 to 1 May 2003:

Wards from 1 May 2003 to 7 May 2015:

Wards from 7 May 2015 to present:

Malvern Hills
Wards from 1 April 1974 (first election 7 June 1973) to 3 May 1979:

Wards from 3 May 1979 to 1 May 1997:

Wards from 1 May 1997 to 1 May 2003:

Wards from 1 May 2003 to present:

Redditch
Wards from 1 April 1974 (first election 7 June 1973) to 5 May 1983:

Wards from 5 May 1983 to 10 June 2004:

Wards from 10 June 2004 to present:

Worcester
Wards from 1 April 1974 (first election 7 June 1973) to 3 May 1979:

Wards from 3 May 1979 to 10 June 2004:

Wards from 10 June 2004 to present:

Wychavon
Wards from 1 April 1974 (first election 7 June 1973) to 3 May 1979:

Wards from 3 May 1979 to 1 May 2003:

Wards from 1 May 2003 to present:

Wyre Forest
Wards from 1 April 1974 (first election 7 June 1973) to 3 May 1979:

Wards from 3 May 1979 to 10 June 2004:

Wards from 10 June 2004 to 7 May 2015:

Wards from 7 May 2015 to present:

Former county council

Hereford and Worcester
Electoral Divisions from 1 April 1974 (first election 12 April 1973) to 2 May 1985:

Electoral Divisions from 2 May 1985 to 1 April 1998 (county abolished):

Former district council

Leominster
See: List of electoral wards in Herefordshire#Leominster

Electoral wards by constituency

Bromsgrove
Alvechurch, Beacon, Catshill, Charford, Drakes Cross and Walkers Heath, Furlongs, Hagley, Hillside, Hollywood and Majors Green, Linthurst, Marlbrook, Norton, St Johns, Sidemoor, Slideslow, Stoke Heath, Stoke Prior, Tardebigge, Uffdown, Waseley, Whitford, Woodvale, Wythall South.

Mid Worcestershire
Badsey, Bengeworth, Bowbrook, Bretforton and Offenham, Broadway and Wickhamford, Dodderhill, Drakes Broughton, Droitwich Central, Droitwich East, Droitwich South East, Droitwich South West, Droitwich West, Evesham North, Evesham South, Fladbury, Great Hampton, Hartlebury, Harvington and Norton, Honeybourne and Pebworth, Little Hampton, Lovett and North Claines, Norton and Whittington, Ombersley, Pinvin, The Littletons, Upton Snodsbury.

Redditch
Abbey, Astwood Bank and Feckenham, Batchley, Central, Church Hill, Crabbs Cross, Greenlands, Headless Cross and Oakenshaw, Inkberrow, Lodge Park, Matchborough, West, Winyates.

West Worcestershire
Alfrick and Leigh, Baldwin, Bredon, Broadheath, Chase, Dyson Perrins, Eckington, Elmley Castle and Somerville, Hallow, Kempsey, Lindridge, Link, Longdon, Martley, Morton, Pershore, Pickersleigh, Powick, Priory, Ripple, South Bredon Hill, Teme Valley, Tenbury, Upton and Hanley, Wells, West, Woodbury.

See also
List of parliamentary constituencies in Herefordshire and Worcestershire

References

 
Worcestershire